Food blogging is a feature of food journalism interlinking a gourmet interest in food, blog writing, and food photography. Food blogs are generally written by food enthusiasts often referred to as a “foodies” and can be used commercially by the blogger to earn a profit. The first food blog launched in July, 1997 as a running feature on the Chowhound web site. Titled “What Jim Had for Dinner”, Chowhound founder Jim Leff cataloged his daily eating.

The majority of food blogs use pictures taken by the author himself/herself and some of them focus specifically on food photography.[2]

There are different types of Food blogging.

 Recipes
 Food/Restaurant Review
 Food and Travel 
 Food Photography

As long as it is blog about food it is considered as food blog. Most often a food blog has overlapping elements of all or some of these elements. A blog is a personal journal and there is no real rule of writing a food blog.

Food and travel 

Food and travel is a type of blogging that involves the engagement of different cultures. These bloggers travel around the globe, visiting and eating their way through cities such as Bangkok, Chengdu, and Tokyo, as well as other food hot spots like Istanbul, Kuala Lumpur, and Karachi, documenting their experience as they go. Food and travel blogging involves research, shooting, editing, investing & scheduling.

Food photography 

Food photography is the art of creating appetizing images using techniques such as lighting, arrangement, and background to be used commercially by the photographer. Visual appeal of the food alone can influence attraction to food photographers and bloggers. The degree to which a food blogger relies on food photography varies from blog to blog. Food photography can help construct the narrative of a food blog and can be used to attract an audience.

Influencers and marketing 
Blogging is a common marketing and brand development tool for restaurants, catering companies, meal delivery services, private chefs, and other food and beverage businesses. Businesses often choose influential bloggers in the market, or "influencers". Influencers, are able to draw a specific audience and build their reputation by consistently posting quality content. Over time, the blogger accumulates influence over some of their audience. Consumers often build a connection with the influencer they closely follow affecting their purchasing decisions. Audiences often trust the endorsement of influencers because while they can be sponsored they are loyal to their followers and have freedom to design their messages. This is what the blogger can "sell" to companies whose products and services they'd endorse or be sponsored by.  

The more popular a blog is, the more opportunities the blogger will have to monetize their content. Bloggers use a variety of business and marketing tactics to maximize traffic, including constructing a persona that can connect with a targeted audience. Here are a few ways a food blogger can go about earning profit online:

 Promoting an affiliate product or service
 Pitching to PR firms
 Ad space
 Sponsored Posts/Ads
 Host Sponsored Contests/Giveaways
 Offer Premium (paid) Content/Memberships
 Private Community
 Site Sponsorship
 Sell Merchandise
 Sell Templates, Ebooks, Tutorials, and other useful content.
 Product Reviews
 Drop-ship Products
 Create a Resource Page

Effects on the foodies 
Even though most bloggers aren't necessarily experts in their area of practice, this doesn't discourage online traffic. In fact, influencer audiences are highly reactive to content like photos, videos, precise instructions or descriptions with regard to the flow of cooking, eating, or even dieting. The loyalty consumers exhibit to bloggers they follow present those bloggers with inconspicuous business opportunities. The majority of feedback is positive and suggestive. For the most part, people follow these blogs to experiment with new recipes, become aware of new food trends, restaurants, and other creative ideas these thought leaders have to offer. 

Primarily, foodies and popular bloggers are informative and persuasive, having been posed between consumers and producers. As a result, huge parts of the culinary landscape have sparked a new level of public interest. Cookbooks have made a comeback, popular chefs are treated like celebrities, and dieting trends have gained more momentum than ever.  All of this can be attributed to the easily read content that bloggers post. The impact of processing or cognitive fluency is in play when discussing the most impactful blog posts, the bloggers who write, make visual demonstrations, guides, and other content that is easily digestible for consumers often yield the most feedback not only in terms of likes, but comments and shares as well. Being a food expert has almost nothing to do with running a successful food blog. The bloggers persona, persuasion, and engagement style are the main components, aside from content, are main determinants of the amount of influence a blogger gains.

References

Food photographers
Journalism